Vilho Rinne (5 April 1895 – 25 June 1980) was a Finnish athlete. He competed in the men's javelin throw at the 1928 Summer Olympics.

References

1895 births
1980 deaths
Athletes (track and field) at the 1928 Summer Olympics
Finnish male javelin throwers
Olympic athletes of Finland
Place of birth missing